The northern theater of the American Revolutionary War also known as the Northern Department of the Continental Army was a theater of operations during the American Revolutionary War.

It was originally called the New York Department, and consisted of all of New York State. On November 12, 1776, after the British occupation of New York City, the Highlands Department was created out of the Northern Department. The Northern Department then stopped 30 miles south of Albany. After that, it was always referred to as the Northern Department.

The Highlands Department was the smallest in area, and was formed around the defenses on the Hudson River north of New York City.

Continental Northern Department 
In 1777, the Northern Department was organised into:

 Commanding Officer of the Northern Department, General Philip Schuyler
 Nixon's Brigade, commanded by Brigadier General John Nixon
4th (Massachusetts) Continental Regiment
 9th (Rhode Island) Continental Regiment
 11th (Rhode Island) Continental Regiment
 12th (Massachusetts) Continental Regiment
 2nd Rhode Island Militia
 De Fermoy's Brigade, commanded by French Brigadier General Matthias Alexis Roche de Fermoy
1st (Pennsylvania) Continental Regiment
 German Battalion (8th Maryland Regiment)
 Poor's Brigade, commanded by Brigadier General Enoch Poor
2nd (New Hampshire) Continental Regiment
 5th (New Hampshire) Continental Regiment
8th (New Hampshire) Continental Regiment
 3rd New York Regiment
4th New York Regiment
 Paterson's Brigade, commanded by Brigadier General John Paterson
10th Massachusetts Regiment
11th Massachusetts Regiment
18th (Massachusetts) Continental Regiment
14th Massachusetts Regiment
 Learned's Brigade, commanded by Brigadier General Ebenezer Learned
16th (Massachusetts) Continental Regiment
 23rd (Massachusetts) Continental Regiment
26th (Massachusetts) Continental Regiment

British Northern Army 
During the Battles of Saratoga, the British northern army consisted of:

 Commanding Officer, Lieutenant General John Burgoyne
 Commander of Artillery & Engineers, Major G. Williams
 detachments of artillery forming 4 composite Companies from the 4th Battalion, Royal Artillery
 Artilleriekompagnie von Pausch (Hesse-Hanau)
 (Captured during the Capture of Fort Ticonderoga) No.6 Company, 4th Battalion, Royal Artillery
 Advanced Corps (vanguard), commanded by Brigadier General S. Fraser
 24th Regiment of Foot
 Fraser's Rangers
 Canadian Provincial Troops (2 coys)
 Indians led by Chief Joseph Brant
 Right Division, commanded by Major General William Phillips
 1st Brigade, commanded by Brigadier General James Inglis Hamilton
 20th Regiment of Foot
 21st Regiment of Foot
 62nd Regiment of Foot
 2nd Brigade, commanded by Brigadier General Henry Watson Powell
 9th Regiment of Foot
 47th Regiment of Foot
 53rd Regiment of Foot
 Left Division (all Germans), commanded by Generalmajor (Major General) Baron Friedrich Adolf Riedesel Freiherr zu Eisenbach (Brunswicker)
 1st (Brunswick) Brigade, commanded by Brigadegeneral Johann Friedrich von Specht
 Musketeerregiment von Rhetz (Brunswick)
 Musketeerregiment von Specht (Brunswick)
 Musketeerregiment von Riedesel (Brunswick)
 2nd Brigade, commanded by Brigadegeneral Wilhelm von Gall (Hesse-Hanau)
 Musketeerregiment von Prinz Fiederich (Brunswick)
 Musketeerregiment von Erbprinz (Hesse-Hanau)
 Reserve (Germans), commanded by Oberstleutnant Heinrich von Breymann
 Brunswickdragoonregiment von Ludwig
 Grenadierbataillon von Breymann (Brunswick)
 Füsilierbataillon von Barner (Brunswick)
 Jägerbataillon von Schottelius

Campaigns
On May 10, 1775, Fort Ticonderoga was captured from the British.

Major General Philip Schuyler was appointed department commander on June 25, 1775. On June 28, 1775 the New York Provincial Congress authorized the raising of the four regiments of the New York Line.

The major campaigns are divided as follows:

 New York and New Jersey campaign
 Saratoga campaign
 Northern theater of the American Revolutionary War after Saratoga

After War years
This department was the only one to remain after the war. The last elements of the Continental Army were kept to guard the western frontier outposts.

See also

List of American Revolutionary War battles
 Departments of the Continental Army

References

Wright, Robert K. The Continental Army. Washington, D.C.: Center of Military History, 1983. Available, in part, online.